Luis Alberto "Lucho" Herrera Herrera, known as "El jardinerito" ("the little gardener") (born May 4, 1961 in Fusagasugá, Colombia), is a retired Colombian road racing cyclist. Herrera was a professional from 1985 to 1992 but had a successful amateur career before that in Colombia.

He entered his first Vuelta a Colombia in 1981 where he finished 16th overall and 3rd in the New Rider competition. Although he abandoned his second Vuelta a Colombia in 1982, he won Colombia's second major stage-race the Clásico RCN. In 1983 Herrera won Clásico RCN again as well as two stages and finishing second overall to Alfonso Florez Ortiz in the 1983 Vuelta a Colombia. In 1984 he would win the Vuelta a Colombia, the Clásico RCN as well as winning stage 17 to Alpe d'Huez in the 1984 Tour de France, becoming the first Colombian to win a stage of the race, and the first amateur cyclist to win a stage in the history of the Tour de France. He would win the Vuelta a Colombia and the Clásico RCN four times each but his greatest achievement was in 1987, when he won the Vuelta a España, the first South American to win a Grand Tour. Herrera also won the Critérium du Dauphiné Libéré in 1988 and 1991 and five "King of the Mountains" jerseys from the three Grand Tours.

Luis Herrera is the second rider to win the King of the Mountains jersey in all three Grand Tours. The first was Federico Bahamontes of Spain.

Career achievements

Major results

1981 
 1st Stage 5 Clásico RCN
1982 
 1st  Overall Clásico RCN
1st Stages 2, 7 & 10 
 4th Overall Tour de l'Avenir
1st Stage 10 
1983 
 1st  Overall Clásico RCN
1st Stage 8 
 Coors Classic
1st Stages 1 & 3 
 1st Stage 6b Grand Prix Guillaume Tell
 2nd Overall Vuelta a Colombia
1st Stages 9 & 14 
1984
 1st  Overall Clásico RCN
1st Stage 8 
 1st  Overall Vuelta a Colombia
1st Stages 6, 9 & 10
 1st Stage 17 Tour de France
1985
 1st  Overall Vuelta a Colombia
1st Stages 5 & 8 
 2nd Overall Clásico RCN
 7th Overall Tour de France
1st  Mountains classification
1st Stages 11 & 14
1986 
 1st  Overall Clásico RCN
1st Prologue, Stages 2 & 4 (ITT) 
 1st  Overall Vuelta a Colombia
1st Stage 6 
1987
 1st  Overall Vuelta a España
1st  Mountains classification
1st Stage 11
 2nd Overall Vuelta a Colombia
1st Prologue 
 5th Overall Tour de France
1st  Mountains classification
1988
 1st  Overall Critérium du Dauphiné Libéré
1st Stage 6b
 1st  Overall Vuelta a Colombia
1st Stages 2 & 11 
 6th Overall Tour de France
1989
 Giro d'Italia
1st  Mountains classification
1st Stages 13 & 18 (ITT)
1990 
 4th Overall Clásico RCN
1st Prologue 
1991
 1st  Overall Critérium du Dauphiné Libéré
1st Stage 5
 Vuelta a España
1st  Mountains classification
1st Stage 16
 1st Stage 6 Volta a Catalunya
 6th Overall Setmana Catalana de Ciclisme
 9th Overall Vuelta a Murcia
1992
 1st  Overall Vuelta a Aragón
1st Stage 5 
 1st Prologue Vuelta a Colombia
 8th Overall Giro d'Italia
1st Stage 9

Grand Tour general classification results timeline

References

External links

1961 births
Colombian Tour de France stage winners
Colombian male cyclists
Colombian Giro d'Italia stage winners
Vuelta a España winners
Colombian Vuelta a España stage winners
Vuelta a Colombia stage winners
Living people
People from Cundinamarca Department